Musée d'automates et de boîtes à musique is a museum located in Sainte-Croix, Switzerland. It specialises in musical boxes and automatons. The museum is owned by the Centre International de la Mécanique d'Art (CIMA, "International Centre for Art Mechanics").

See also 
 List of music museums

External links 

 CIMA

Museums in the canton of Vaud
Music museums in Switzerland
Musical instrument museums
Amusement museums